NGC 4623 is an edge-on lenticular or elliptical galaxy located about 54 million light-years away in the constellation of Virgo. NGC 4623 is classified as an E7, a rare type of "late" elliptical that represents the first stage of transition into a lenticular galaxy.  NGC 4623 was discovered by astronomer William Herschel on April 13, 1784. NGC 4623 is a member of the Virgo Cluster.

See also 
 List of NGC objects (4001–5000)
 NGC 3115- another edge-on lenticular galaxy

References

External links

Lenticular galaxies
Elliptical galaxies
Virgo (constellation)
4623
42647
7862
Astronomical objects discovered in 1784
Virgo Cluster